Under the provisions of the Scotland Act, 1998, regional members of the Scottish Parliament who resign, die or are otherwise disqualified are replaced by the next available and willing person of their original party's list, so no by-election occurs.

These are the changes that have occurred to since the first elections in 1999.

List of regional list member changes

2021 - 2026 Parliamentary term

2016 - 2021 Parliamentary term

2011 – 2016 Parliamentary term

2007 – 2011 Parliamentary term

2003 – 2007 Parliamentary term

1999 – 2003 Parliamentary term

See also
 Elections in Scotland
 List of by-elections to the Scottish Parliament
 Regional Member changes to Senedd Cymru

References

Scottish Parliament